Lena Warnstetten is a 1925 German silent film directed by Erich Eriksen and starring Grete Reinwald and William Dieterle.

Cast
In alphabetical order
 Carl Auen as Herr von Romitten  
 William Dieterle as Freiherr von Borkenhagen  
 Karl Elzer as Prinz Ludwig  
 Fritz Kuhlbrodt as Joseph  
 Philipp Manning as Baron von Warnstetten  
 Ernst Pittschau 
 Grete Reinwald as Lena 
 Frida Richard 
 Sonja Wernsdorf as Warnstetten Frau

References

Bibliography
 Hans-Michael Bock and Tim Bergfelder. The Concise Cinegraph: An Encyclopedia of German Cinema. Berghahn Books.

External links

1925 films
Films of the Weimar Republic
Films directed by Erich Eriksen
German silent feature films
Films based on German novels
German black-and-white films
National Film films